The Commissioner of the Turks and Caicos was the administrator of the Turks and Caicos Islands from 1874 to 1959.

A list of Commissioners:

 Daniel Thomas Smith 1874-1878
 Edward Noel Walker 1878
 Robert Baxter Llewelyn 1878-1883
 Frederick Shedden Sanguinetti (1847–1906) 1883-1885
 Henry Moore Jackson 1885-1888
 Alexis Wynns Harriott 1888-1891
 Henry Huggins (Governor) 1891-1893
 Edward John Cameron (1858–1901) 1893-1899
 Geoffrey Peter St. Aubyn (1858–1947) 1899-1901
 William Douglas Young 1901-1905
 Frederick Henry Watkins (1859–1928) 1905-1914
 George Whitfield Smith (1861–1934) 1914-1923 
 Harold Ernest Phillips (1877–1941) 1923-1932
 Hugh Houston Hutchings (1869–1937) 1933-1934
 Frank Cecil Clarkson 1934-1936
 Hugh Charles Norwood Hill 1936-1940
 Edwin Porter Arrowsmith (1909–1992) 1940-1946
 Cyril Eric Wool-Lewis 1947-1952
 Peter Bleackley (1915-) 1952-1955
 Ernest Gordon Lewis (1918–2006) 1955-1958
 Geoffrey Colin Guy 1958-1959

References

 Turks and Caicos Islands

 
Commissioners